Romain David Jeremie Grosjean (born 17 April 1986) is a Swiss-French professional racing driver, competing under the French flag in the NTT IndyCar Series, driving the No. 28 Honda for Andretti Autosport. Grosjean had previously spent nine full-time seasons in Formula One for a variety of teams, picking up 10 podiums, all with Lotus.

He dominated the 2005 French Formula Renault championship at his first attempt and joined the Renault young driver programme. He was the 2007 Formula 3 Euro Series drivers' champion. In 2008, he became the inaugural GP2 Asia Series champion and came fourth in his first year in GP2. Due to the Asia and Main GP2 series being discontinued, this will likely remain true for the foreseeable future.

In , Grosjean returned to Formula One with the Lotus F1 Team, alongside Kimi Räikkönen. He took his first Formula One podium at the 2012 Bahrain Grand Prix and took his first fastest lap in the 2012 Spanish Grand Prix. He became the first driver since 1994 to receive a race ban after causing a multi-car pile-up, at the 2012 Belgian Grand Prix. In  he remained with Lotus, taking six podiums. In what would be his final Formula One race, Grosjean survived a dramatic crash during the 2020 Bahrain Grand Prix when his car separated in two and caught fire after penetrating a metal guardrail on the first lap. Grosjean sustained minor burns and credited the halo with saving his life.

After the 2020 Formula One season, Grosjean moved to the IndyCar Series. He obtained his first pole position and podium in his third race, the Grand Prix of Indianapolis.

Early life 
Grosjean was born in Geneva, Switzerland. He was born to a Swiss father and a French mother. He is the great-grandson of Edgar Brandt, weapon designer and founder of Brandt. He is also the grandson of skier Fernand Grosjean, silver medalist in giant slalom at the 1950 World Ski Championship in Aspen.

Early racing career 
Grosjean won all ten rounds of the 2003 Formula Lista Junior championship and moved to the French Formula Renault championship for 2004. He was seventh in that first season with one win and was champion in 2005 with ten victories. He also appeared in the Formula Renault Eurocup and finished on the podium twice in Valencia. With his results and potential in the Formula Renault series, Grosjean joined the Renault Driver Development programme for the continuation of his career.

Formula Three 
Grosjean made his Formula Three debut at the 2005 Macau Grand Prix, standing in for Loïc Duval at Signature-Plus. He qualified 19th and raced to ninth, beating teammates Fábio Carbone and Guillaume Moreau.

He did a full season in the 2006 Formula 3 Euro Series but had a tough year, taking only one podium finish and ending the year 13th. In a one-off appearance in the British Formula Three Championship he started on pole position for both races at Pau, won both, and set the fastest lap in each.

He stayed in the Formula 3 Euro Series for 2007 but moved to the ASM team, for which Jamie Green, Lewis Hamilton, and Paul di Resta won the previous three titles. Sébastien Buemi led the championship in the early stages but Grosjean moved ahead with a victory in the ninth race of the season at Mugello. He maintained a lead in the standings from that point onwards and won the title at the final round of the year with one race in hand.

Grosjean took pole position for the prestigious Masters of Formula 3 race at Zolder but finished 14th after stalling at the start.

GP2 Series 

Grosjean drove for ART in the inaugural GP2 Asia Series season alongside Stephen Jelley, winning both races of the first round of the championship. He went on to win the championship with four race victories and sixty-one points overall.

He stayed with ART Grand Prix team for the 2008 GP2 Series. His teammates were Luca Filippi and Sakon Yamamoto.

In the first round at the Circuit de Catalunya, Grosjean started 11th after engine problems in qualifying. He rose through the field to finish fifth in the feature race, giving him fourth on the grid for the shorter sprint race. After a good start Grosjean was up to second and then passed Kobayashi for the lead. But Grosjean made a mistake on a late rolling restart and Kobayashi tried to pass him again for the lead. Grosjean moved across on Kobayashi to keep the position but the stewards decided his defensive move was illegal and gave him a drive-through penalty dropping him to 13th at the end of the race. Victory in the sprint race at Istanbul, the fourth round of the season, moved Grosjean into second place in the championship. Despite dropping back from this position, he finished the season fourth and achieved the distinction of being the highest-placed rookie in the championship.

2008 Formula 3 Euro Series champion Nico Hülkenberg joined Pastor Maldonado at ART for 2009, forcing Grosjean out of the team. Nonetheless, Renault placed him at 2008 team champions Campos Grand Prix for 2009, now known as Barwa Addax. Despite missing the last four rounds, Grosjean finished fourth in the championship standings.

Initial stint in Formula One 
He drove a Formula One car for the first time at the UK round of the 2008 World Series by Renault weekend at Silverstone on 7 and 8 June 2008, where he gave a number of demonstrations of the previous year's R27 car.

Renault (2009) 
He initially continued in the test driver role at Renault for 2009 but took over Piquet's seat in the wake of the Crashgate controversy from the  onwards. He was knocked out of Q2 0.323 seconds off the pace of teammate Fernando Alonso. He finished 15th in the race after a first-lap collision with Luca Badoer necessitated a stop for a new front wing. For the next round in Belgium Grosjean qualified 19th, which he blamed on traffic and yellow flags. In the race, he was eliminated on the first lap after a collision with Jenson Button. He described himself as "very disappointed" after the race.

He was hopeful of making progress in the race, but the brake problems reappeared, forcing him to retire after just three laps. He was promoted to 17th due to Timo Glock being unable to start the race. He was unable to make progress in the race, finishing 16th after struggling with understeer throughout the race on the unfamiliar circuit. He qualified 13th in his repaired car, gained positions at the start, but then slipped back down to 13th after complaining of grip and tyre temperature problems, his best result of the season. At the season-ending , Grosjean qualified 19th, and finished 18th and last, again complaining of brake problems during the race. He said afterward that he had "learnt an enormous amount this year, especially being a teammate to Fernando".

On 31 January 2010, after the end of the season news reports had doubts that Grosjean would keep his seat into 2010, Renault confirmed that Grosjean's former GP2 teammate at the Addax Team, Vitaly Petrov would be the team's second driver alongside Robert Kubica for the 2010 season, leaving Grosjean without a Formula One drive for 2010. However, in September 2010, it was confirmed by tyre manufacturer Pirelli that Grosjean would complete a test for the company, in anticipation of their return to supplying tyres to the F1 grid in 2011. Grosjean replaced Nick Heidfeld, who left his testing duties to take up a race seat at Sauber.

Stint outside of Formula One

Sportscars 

After leaving Formula One, Grosjean became involved in sportscar racing. In March 2010, Grosjean secured a drive in the inaugural FIA GT1 World Championship, driving a Ford GT1 for the Matech Competition team alongside German driver Thomas Mutsch. The pairing won the opening Championship Race of the season in Abu Dhabi and added a second victory at Brno in May to lead the standings after the first three rounds of the season.

In June 2010, Grosjean made his debut in the famous Le Mans 24 Hours endurance race, sharing a Ford GT1 with Mutsch and Jonathan Hirschi. After qualifying third in the LMGT1 class, they were forced to retire from the race after 171 laps.

Auto GP 
In June 2010, Grosjean made a return to single-seaters, racing for the DAMS team in the third round of the Auto GP season at Spa-Francorchamps. After dominating practice and taking pole position, he won the feature race before finishing second to Carlos Iaconelli in the sprint event. Over the course of the weekend, Grosjean accumulated 18 points out of a possible 19 on offer and took away €80,000 prize money as the event's top points scorer. He went on to win three more races to take the title at Monza 16 points ahead of runner-up Edoardo Piscopo.

Return to GP2 

On 20 July 2010, Grosjean announced that he would return to GP2 with the DAMS team. He replaced the then Renault test driver Jérôme d'Ambrosio for the German round of the championship. He later substituted for D'Ambrosio's injured teammate, Ho-Pin Tung, from the Belgian round onwards (despite Tung recovering and returning to the series with a different team), finishing 3rd in Belgium and Abu Dhabi to take fourteenth place in the drivers' standings, only two positions behind D'Ambrosio.

Grosjean returned to GP2 full-time with DAMS for the 2011 GP2 Series and GP2 Asia Series seasons. He took two pole positions and one race victory to win the Asia Series by six points from Jules Bianchi, and also won the first race of the main series to lead that championship as well. He lost the championship lead to Giedo van der Garde, after the second round of the series, after an event which was hampered by disqualification due to a technical infringement, but regained it again the following week at Monaco, scoring points in both races despite starting from last place on the grid. After scoring four further wins as part of a mid-season run that included six consecutive podium finishes, he pulled clear of his pursuers and clinched the championship at the penultimate round at Spa-Francorchamps.

Return to Formula One

Lotus (2012–2015) 

Lotus Renault had planned to run Robert Kubica and Vitaly Petrov throughout 2011 but Kubica had a horrific rally accident and was unable to drive during 2011. Former BMW Sauber teammate Nick Heidfeld replaced Kubica for the first 11 races before himself being replaced by Senna from the Belgian Grand Prix onwards. In late October 2011, Lotus Renault announced that Grosjean would drive in the first Friday free practice session in the Abu Dhabi Grand Prix (replacing Senna) and the Brazilian Grand Prix (replacing Petrov).

2012 

He fell to sixth at the start and retired on the second lap after a collision with Pastor Maldonado, which broke his right-front suspension. At the 2012 Bahrain Grand Prix he finished third, collecting his first Formula One podium and the first for a French driver since Jean Alesi at the 1998 Belgian Grand Prix. In Spain Grosjean started third, finished fourth and set his first fastest lap in Formula One; the first for a French driver since Alesi at the 1996 Monaco Grand Prix. At the 2012 Canadian Grand Prix, he collected his second Formula One podium with a career best finish of second, behind Lewis Hamilton.

At Valencia, Grosjean was running second when the car's electronics malfunctioned forcing Grosjean's first mechanical-related retirement of the season. At the start of the race, he was involved in an incident with Paul di Resta, which forced a pit stop for a new front wing. However, Grosjean fought back through the field to finish in sixth just behind his teammate.

At Spa Grosjean caused a multi-car pile-up at the start of the race, with Hamilton, Fernando Alonso and Sergio Pérez all eliminated from the race as well as Grosjean; the incident was started when Grosjean drove into Hamilton on the approach to the La Source corner. Grosjean was given a one race ban post-race (the first driver to be banned since Michael Schumacher in ), as well as a fine of €50,000, with the FIA saying in a statement "The stewards regard this incident as an extremely serious breach of the regulations, which had the potential to cause injury to others. It eliminated leading championship contenders from the race. The stewards note [that] the team conceded the action was an extremely serious mistake and an error of judgement. Neither the team nor the driver made any submission in mitigation of penalty." He was replaced for the 2012 Italian Grand Prix by Lotus test and reserve driver Jérôme d'Ambrosio. Grosjean's actions were condemned by many drivers in the paddock. In São Paulo Grosjean hit the back of Pedro de la Rosa's HRT in qualifying.

On 14–16 December Grosjean won the Race of Champions after a Grand Final victory over Le Mans legend Tom Kristensen at the Rajamangala Stadium in Bangkok. The day before Grosjean finished in second place in the Nations' Cup event along with his teammate Sébastien Ogier in the French team, after defeat by Germany's Sebastian Vettel and Michael Schumacher.

On 17 December 2012, it was confirmed that Grosjean would stay at Lotus for the  season.

2013 

He had three points-scoring finishes at the three opening races before receiving a new chassis to help his chances at Bahrain; he qualified 11th and climbed to third. At the next race in Spain, his suspension failed on lap 9. He qualified 13th but his race ended when he crashed into the back of Daniel Ricciardo, earning him a 10-place grid penalty for the next race. At the  he started last on the grid due to the grid penalty but ran as high as eighth in the race before finishing 13th as he had to stop for a third time due to heavy tyre wear. Grosjean retired on the last lap while in 8th position due to serious front wing damage. At the  after qualifying 5th he led the race for a while and seemed to be on a faster pace than Sebastian Vettel but the intervention of the safety car changed the race. He was forced to let his teammate Kimi Räikkönen pass towards the end of the race as Räikkönen had faster tyres. Grosjean resisted Fernando Alonso to earn his second podium of the season behind Vettel and Räikkönen.

At the  Grosjean qualified 3rd on the grid but finished the race in 6th position after receiving a drive-through penalty for crossing the white line as he overtook Felipe Massa. After the race, he was given a further 20-second time penalty for colliding with Jenson Button, however, this did not affect his final position. At the  Grosjean qualified 7th on the grid, and Lotus chose to operate a one-stop strategy on Grosjean's car. Later in the race, he was sent off track by Sergio Pérez while Pérez was attempting an overtake – Pérez received a drive-through penalty for the incident. Grosjean finished the race in 8th position after being overtaken by Massa towards the end of the race. At the  Grosjean qualified 13th as both Lotuses showed a slow pace in practice. After a slow pit stop, he came back to finish in 8th after many overtaking moves and resisting Lewis Hamilton on the last lap. In Singapore Grosjean had a difficult weekend full of mechanical problems; and despite qualifying 3rd, he was forced to retire due to an engine issue. At the  he qualified 4th and was moved up to third on the grid after a grid penalty for Webber. He made a good start in which he overtook Hamilton and was closing on Vettel until the safety car came out. This intervention aided Räikkönen's progression up the order, and after a small mistake, Grosjean was overtaken by his teammate. Grosjean maintained position behind Räikkönen and secured his third podium of the season, in third.

The next weekend, at Suzuka, he qualified 4th. After a poor start by the Red Bulls on the front row, Grosjean took the lead into the first corner and showed a good pace compared to the Red Bulls behind him, leading almost half the race. Vettel passed him on lap 28 and he was also later overtaken by Mark Webber, and finished 3rd for the second straight race. In India, Grosjean failed to reach Q2 on medium tyres to save softer tyres, and he ultimately qualified 17th. In the race, he had a longer first stint with soft tyres to apply a one pit stop strategy that worked perfectly as he finished 3rd behind Vettel and Rosberg after overtaking Massa and then Räikkönen who forced him off the track on his first overtaking attempt. At Abu Dhabi, after qualifying 7th (and being promoted to 6th due to teammate Räikkönen's penalty), he had another strong start and strong race, finishing 4th. In the race, Grosjean had a strong start once again, by overtaking Webber and nearly overtaking Vettel. Leading a lap during the pit stop phase, Grosjean finished 2nd by holding off Webber despite numerous overtaking attempts.

On 29 November 2013, it was confirmed that Grosjean would continue with Lotus in 2014.

2014 

A new rule for the 2014 season allowed the drivers to pick a car number to use for their entire career. Grosjean was awarded his first choice of number 8. He explained his choice of number on his Facebook page: "Simply I like this number, plus it has some signification to me. My wife was born on 8 December, we started dating in 2008 and besides, to my eyes my son is the 8th wonder of the world. That's why I picked up number 8." Among all the races in 2014, he was only able to score on two occasions and claim 8 points.

2015 

In 2015, Lotus produced a much better car, which was powered by a Mercedes engine. Grosjean showed great potential in testing, but mechanical problems in Australia and a spin after contact with Sergio Pérez in Malaysia prevented Grosjean from scoring points. But after the first two troubled races, Grosjean recorded good performances in China and Bahrain, finishing 7th on both occasions. In Spain, Lotus struggled in practice and qualifying and Grosjean missed out on Q3 for the first time in the season. But in the race, his pace improved and he finished 8th, despite making contact with Pastor Maldonado in the opening laps and a mistake in the pits, both of which cost him some time. In Monaco, Grosjean was on for his fourth consecutive points finish, despite a grid penalty for a gearbox change, but he was hit by Max Verstappen while battling for position. Grosjean managed to rejoin, but lost time and finished 12th.

In Canada, Lotus had one of the fastest cars and Grosjean qualified in an impressive 5th place. In the race, he was in the top 5 but made contact with the Marussia of Will Stevens, which punctured his tyre. Grosjean had to pit for new tyres, but managed to recover and finished in the points. In Austria, he was racing in the top 10, but he had a mechanical issue and could not finish the race. In Great Britain, he retired on lap 1 after contact with Daniel Ricciardo and teammate Maldonado. In Hungary, he struggled again and even had a penalty for an unsafe release in the pits. But near the end of the race, he made up a lot of positions due to other drivers having problems. In the end, he managed to repeat his best finish of the season of 7th, finishing ahead of Nico Rosberg's Mercedes. In Belgium, Lotus again had one of the fastest cars and Grosjean qualified in 4th, but started 9th, because of a penalty. In the race, he consistently gained positions, and a few laps before the finish, Grosjean was running 4th. Ahead of him was Vettel, who was on very old tyres, and Grosjean caught up with him with 5 laps to go. He was not able to overtake, but Vettel's right rear tyre exploded on the penultimate lap. Grosjean moved into the podium positions, to record his first such result since 2013. After the race, Grosjean said that he cried on the last lap.

In Italy Grosjean once again made it into Q3, qualifying in 8th, but was involved in some contact in turn 1, which caused his retirement. In Singapore, he was forced to retire a few laps before the end because of a suspected gearbox issue. In Japan, Grosjean was in 6th place after the start but lost a position during the first stops to Nico Hülkenberg. Near the end of the race, he was under pressure from Maldonado, who had closed the gap to just over a second, but Grosjean managed to retain his 7th position to the finish and scored points for the first time since Belgium.

Haas F1 Team (2016–2020)

2016 

On 29 September 2015, it was announced that Grosjean would race for the Haas F1 Team, who were joining the Formula One grid for the  season. He was partnered by former Sauber driver and Ferrari test driver Esteban Gutiérrez. He was eventually voted Formula One's first Driver of the Day. Grosjean scored again in the following  by finishing in fifth position, winning Driver of the Day again.

Following Jenson Button's retirement from full-time racing, the members of the GPDA elected Grosjean to replace Button as one of the directors of the GPDA in May 2017.

2017 

Grosjean drove for Haas for the 2017 season where he partnered Kevin Magnussen. He had multiple retirements, such as in the 2017 Australian Grand Prix, where he retired due to a water leak. His second retirement came at the 2017 Russian Grand Prix, when he had a collision with Jolyon Palmer. His third and final retirement of the season was in the 2017 Hungarian Grand Prix due to a wheel nut. He scored 28 points in total from 8 occasions and finished the season 13th.

2018 

Haas retained Grosjean for the 2018 season where he again partnered Magnussen. At the Azerbaijan Grand Prix, Grosjean crashed behind the safety car whilst running in 6th place. His engineer incorrectly blamed the cause of the crash on Sauber driver Marcus Ericsson, saying, "I think Ericsson hit us." At the Spanish Grand Prix, Grosjean was the cause of a crash on the opening lap. Whilst making his way through turn 3, he lost control of his Haas after running through dirty air. This caused him to spin across the track into the path of the cars behind him, causing a large amount of smoke in the process. He was then hit by Hülkenberg and Gasly, eliminating all three from the race. In the Austrian Grand Prix, Grosjean finished 4th, his best result in his career at Haas, and his first points finish in 2018. Grosjean was disqualified from the Italian Grand Prix after the floor of his car was found to be illegal, taking away a 6th-place finish; although the team appealed this, the decision was upheld. Grosjean finished the season 14th with 37 points.

2019 
On 28 September 2018 it was confirmed that Haas would retain Grosjean for the 2019 season, again partnering Magnussen. Like his 2018 season, Grosjean's 2019 was plagued with reliability issues, poor luck and driver errors. Additionally, the Haas VF-19 suffered from poor pace throughout the season, often qualifying well but falling far behind during races.

The first two races saw a double retirement for Grosjean. In Australia, a wheel was incorrectly fitted during a pit stop, causing it to come loose on track in an extremely similar incident to his race in Australia the year before. In Bahrain he was hit by Lance Stroll on the opening lap, causing terminal damage. An 11th-place finish in China followed, before a third retirement in four races in Azerbaijan due to a brake failure. Grosjean scored his first point of the season by finishing 10th in Spain, and followed this up with another 10th-place finish in Monaco.

Grosjean finished 14th in Canada after a collision in front of him on the first lap sent debris into his car, causing him to lose positions. He then retired from the next race, his home race in France. Another retirement came two races later in Britain, after contact with teammate Magnussen on the first lap, ending the races of both drivers. Both were blamed and criticised for the incident, at a race in which Grosjean was testing the old spec of the VF-19 so that the team could understand their recent lack of pace. His best—and final—points finish of the season came in Germany, when he crossed the line in 9th place but was promoted to 7th after the Alfa Romeo drivers were penalised post-race for the use of driver aids.

Another retirement came in Hungary due to a hydraulics issue. In Singapore, Grosjean tagged George Russell during an overtake attempt, damaging his front wing and causing the Williams driver to crash into a wall. Grosjean finished the race in 11th. Another retirement followed in Russia after a first-lap collision with Daniel Ricciardo and Antonio Giovinazzi sent him into the barriers. In Brazil, Grosjean was running in 7th place late in the race behind Pierre Gasly and ahead of Carlos Sainz Jr., before issues with his car dropped him back to 14th by the finish line (13th after a penalty for Nico Hülkenberg). Gasly and Sainz would go on to finish 2nd and 3rd in the race.

Grosjean ended the season in 18th place in the championship with 8 points, his worst full-season in Formula One.

2020 

On 19 September 2019, Haas announced that Grosjean would remain with the team for the 2020 season alongside Magnussen.

At the 2020 Bahrain Grand Prix, Grosjean suffered a serious crash on the first lap in which his Haas VF-20 hit a barrier at high speed, splitting the car in half, releasing the fuel and causing a significant fire. The force and angle of the impact caused the driver's compartment and the front half of the car to be wedged into the barrier, while the rear half was separated from the rest of the vehicle, igniting the car immediately upon impact.

He was able to exit the car unaided, and was helped away from the crash scene by Alan van der Merwe and Ian Roberts, with minor burn injuries to his hands and ankles before being airlifted to a nearby military hospital. The crash caused a red flag for more than an hour to recover the chassis and repair the damaged barrier section. The halo-head protective device, introduced in Formula One in 2018, was credited with saving his life: it sheltered Grosjean's head and body from coming into contact with the barrier upon collision. Grosjean ultimately missed the last 2 races of the season, and was replaced by Pietro Fittipaldi.

Grosjean's contract with Haas was not renewed after 2020. He underwent surgery for his injuries on 16 December.

Mercedes test 
Grosjean was due to test drive the Mercedes AMG F1 W10 EQ Power+, which won the 2019 Formula One World Championship, for a full day of testing with the team at the  2021 French Grand Prix. The test was delayed due to pandemic related travel restrictions.

IndyCar 
From 2021 onward Grosjean chose to compete in the IndyCar Series.

Dale Coyne Racing (2021)

For 2021 Grosjean competed on a joint deal between Dale Coyne Racing and Rick Ware Racing with backing from Honda. Grosjean was scheduled to only participate in the street and road course events in the 2021 season but he later announced after the Indianapolis 500 that he would run the Bommarito Automotive Group 500 to get experience racing on ovals for a potential full schedule in 2022. Because his only oval race would be on what IndyCar considers a short oval Haas F1 Team colleague Pietro Fittipaldi was signed to replace Grosjean for IndyCar's three races on superspeedways, the double header at Texas Motor Speedway and the 2021 Indianapolis 500.

Grosjean quickly adapted to IndyCar racing and immediately showed pace. He recorded three podium finishes on the season; two second-place finishes at both rounds on the IMS Road Course and a third-place finish Laguna Seca. In addition he made the final round of qualifying at both rounds on the IMS Road Course and Detroit, Nashville, and Long Beach. The highpoint of Grosjean's season was at the first round at Indianapolis, where after sitting out for two weeks he returned and out qualified fellow rookie Scott McLaughlin , Josef Newgarden, Jack Harvey, Conor Daly, and Alex Palou to earn his first IndyCar pole position and first pole position since May 2011, when he was on pole in GP2 at Istanbul Park with DAMS. He went on to finish in second place behind winner Rinus VeeKay. Other highlights included making up ten positions at Laguna Seca, several passes of which he made at the famed "Corkscrew", the location of Alex Zanardi's iconic pass on Bryan Herta in 1996, and his first ever oval race at Gateway, where he recorded the most overtakes for the race despite finishing fourteenth. Grosjean also recorded top ten finishes at Barber, Road America, and Mid-Ohio.

Grosjean's arrival to IndyCar coincided with the arrival of three-time Supercars champion Scott McLaughlin and seven-time NASCAR champion Jimmie Johnson to the series, creating what some pundits dubbed the most intriguing rookie class to American Open Wheel Racing since the arrival of Nigel Mansell to CART in the early 1990s. Many pundits picked Grosjean to have the strongest season of the three due to his extensive open-wheel experience, picking him to be a potential candidate for IndyCar Rookie of the Year despite competing for a team with significantly fewer resources than McLaughlin's Team Penske or Johnson's Chip Ganassi Racing and not racing a full schedule. While Johnson would be the slowest to adapt to IndyCar racing and would run the fewest events of the three, McLaughlin and Grosjean were frequently measured against each other throughout the season. McLaughlin outperformed Grosjean four times during their rookie seasons; at St. Petersburg where he had made his IndyCar debut the previous year while Grosjean was racing there for the first time, at Grosjean's first-ever oval race at Gateway, and at Portland and Long Beach after Grosjean was caught up in an accident caused by other drivers on the opening laps. Grosjean's performances were so strong that despite his partial schedule he was nearly able to outscore McLaughlin for the Rookie of the Year award heading into the final race at Long Beach. Both Grosjean and McLaughlin downplayed any comparisons between the two, with Grosjean noting that comparing the two's rookie results in IndyCar did not take into account his nearly two decades of open-wheel racing compared to only one year of open-wheel racing experience for McLaughlin.

Andretti Autosport (2022 onwards)

2022 

Grosjean drove Andretti Autosport's No. 28 DHL Honda entry in the 2022 season, replacing the outgoing Ryan Hunter-Reay. Grosjean underwent his rookie orientation at Indianapolis Motor Speedway on October 5, 2021, and confirmed that he will be racing in the 2022 Indianapolis 500 along with the entire 2022 schedule. Grosjean picked up his first podium with Andretti Autosport at Long Beach, nearly taking the win from Josef Newgarden before an accident caused by Takuma Sato caused the race to finish under caution. He managed to advance to Q2 in his first Indianapolis 500 but ultimately crashed out of the race. Overall 2022 was a difficult season for Grosjean, as he struggled with bad luck and on track contact with teammates and other drivers.

2023 
In 2023 Grosjean won the pole at the season opener but a late race collision with Scott McLaughlin ended his chances of a victory.

Personal life 
Grosjean married French journalist and television presenter Marion Jollès on 27 June 2012 in Chamonix. They have been together since 2008. On 29 July 2013, Marion gave birth to a son, Sacha. They have a second child named Simon who was born on 16 May 2015 and a daughter named Camille who was born on 31 December 2017. After Grosjean signed with Andretti Autosport and committed to racing full time in the IndyCar series he announced that he and his family would be moving to Miami due to the city's selection of French-language schools and the ability to get direct flights between Miami and Paris.

Other ventures 
Grosjean holds endorsements with various brands including Christian Roth (Via DITA Eyewear), Richard Mille, Bell Sports, and Seier Capital.

In 2014 Grosjean was featured in French disc jockey David Guetta's music video titled "Dangerous".

In October 2017 Grosjean launched Cuisine et Confidences, a cookbook he authored with his wife.

Grosjean also founded R8G eSports, a sim racing team.

He also has his own YouTube Channel called Romain Grosjean Official with 255K subscribers which he launched in November 2017.

Racing record

Karting career summary

Racing career summary 

† As Grosjean was a guest driver, he was ineligible to score points.
* Season still in progress.

Single seater racing results

Complete Formula 3 Euro Series results 
(key) (Races in bold indicate pole position; races in italics indicate fastest lap)

Complete GP2 Asia Series results 
(key) (Races in bold indicate pole position; races in italics indicate fastest lap)

Complete GP2 Series results 
(key) (Races in bold indicate pole position; races in italics indicate fastest lap)

Complete Auto GP results 
(key) (Races in bold indicate pole position; races in italics indicate fastest lap)

Complete Formula One results 
(key) (Races in bold indicate pole position; races in italics indicate fastest lap)

 Did not finish, but was classified as he had completed more than 90% of the race distance.

American open-wheel racing results

IndyCar Series
(key) (Races in bold indicate pole position; races in italics indicate fastest lap)

Indianapolis 500

Sports car racing results

Complete GT1 World Championship results 
(key)

Complete IMSA SportsCar Championship results
(key) (Races in bold indicate pole position; results in italics indicate fastest lap)

24 Hours of Le Mans results

Notes

References

External links 

 
 

1986 births
Living people
Sportspeople from Geneva
French racing drivers
French Formula One drivers
Renault Formula One drivers
Lotus F1 Formula One drivers
Swiss racing drivers
French Formula Renault 2.0 drivers
Formula Renault 2.0 Alps drivers
Formula Renault Eurocup drivers
Formula Lista Junior drivers
Formula 3 Euro Series drivers
Formula 3 Euro Series champions
British Formula Three Championship drivers
GP2 Series drivers
GP2 Asia Series champions
GP2 Asia Series drivers
Auto GP drivers
FIA GT1 World Championship drivers
GP2 Series Champions
IndyCar Series drivers
Indianapolis 500 drivers
Swiss-French people
Swiss expatriate sportspeople in France
French people of Swiss descent
Swiss people of French descent
24 Hours of Spa drivers
Haas Formula One drivers
Twitch (service) streamers
SG Formula drivers
Signature Team drivers
ART Grand Prix drivers
Campos Racing drivers
DAMS drivers
Dale Coyne Racing drivers
Andretti Autosport drivers
Lamborghini Squadra Corse drivers
Iron Lynx drivers
WeatherTech SportsCar Championship drivers
French expatriate sportspeople in the United States
Swiss expatriate sportspeople in the United States
French YouTubers
Swiss YouTubers
French cookbook writers